Ariadne Hernández Rodríguez is a paralympic track and field athlete from Mexico competing mainly in category F53 middle to long-distance events.

Ariadne competed in both the 2000 and 2004 Summer Paralympics, on both occasions in the 800m, 1500m, 5000m and marathon.  She won a total of three medals, all in the 2000 games, a silver in the 5000m and bronzes in both the 800m and 1500m.

References

Paralympic athletes of Mexico
Athletes (track and field) at the 2000 Summer Paralympics
Athletes (track and field) at the 2004 Summer Paralympics
Paralympic silver medalists for Mexico
Paralympic bronze medalists for Mexico
Living people
Wheelchair racers at the 2000 Summer Olympics
Mexican female wheelchair racers
Paralympic wheelchair racers
Medalists at the 2000 Summer Paralympics
Year of birth missing (living people)
Paralympic medalists in athletics (track and field)
Medalists at the 2007 Parapan American Games